Abdel Latif Fatihi (born 23 April 1951) is a Moroccan boxer. He competed in the men's light heavyweight event at the 1976 Summer Olympics.  His only bout was a round-of-32 match versus Leon Spinks of the United States. Spinks, the eventual gold medalist, won by a first-round knockout.

References

1951 births
Living people
Moroccan male boxers
Olympic boxers of Morocco
Boxers at the 1976 Summer Olympics
Place of birth missing (living people)
Light-heavyweight boxers